The Rolls-Royce RB.93 Soar, also given the Ministry of Supply designation RSr., was a small, expendable British axial-flow turbojet intended for cruise missile use and built by Rolls-Royce Limited in the 1950s and 1960s. Like all the company's gas turbine engines it was named after a British river, in this case, the River Soar.

Design and development
The Soar was developed in the early 1950s, and was demonstrated at the Farnborough Airshow in 1953 on each wingtip of a Gloster Meteor flying testbed. It was the smallest aero-engine ever made by Rolls-Royce and was an extremely simple engine with very few parts. Its starting and control systems were almost non-existent. Lessons learned in producing the Soar at low weight and cost would be applied to the next light-weight engine, the RB108 lift engine. 
 
As a cruise-missile expendable powerplant the Soar engine had a design life of 10 hours for a Red Rapier flight time of about 1 hour (range 400 nautical miles at 475 knots).

Applications
It was to be the intended powerplant for the "Red Rapier" missile project one of the projects coming from the UB.109T operational requirement. Red Rapier was to be built by Vickers-Armstrong Ltd, Weybridge, Surrey as the Vickers 825. Development was cancelled in 1953. Three Soar engines were used on this design, two on the tips of the tailplane, and one on the tip of the fin. One-third scale models without engines were built and air launched from a Washington bomber (the Boeing B-29 Superfortress in RAF service) on the Woomera missile range to test the aerodynamics and autopilot operation.

As the Westinghouse J81 it was a powerplant for the US AQM-35 missile  

It was employed as an auxiliary powerplant for the Italian Aerfer Ariete fighter design and also considered as a JATO powerplant for other aircraft.

The Soar project was cancelled in March 1965, at a reported total cost of £1.2 million.

Specifications (RB.93 Soar)

See also

References

Notes

Bibliography

Gunston, Bill. World Encyclopedia of Aero Engines. Cambridge, England. Patrick Stephens Limited, 1989. 
 Gunston, Bill. Rolls-Royce Aero Engines. Cambridge, England. Patrick Stephens Limited, 1989.

External links

Image of a Rolls-Royce Soar
Image of the same engine from another angle

Soar
1950s turbojet engines